Gadberry may refer to:
A minor planet, see List of minor planets: 20001–21000
Gadberry, Kentucky, a community in the United States